HMS Grecian was a sixteen-gun  built for the Royal Navy during the 1830s.

Description
The ship's tonnage was 484  tons burthen. Grecian was armed with sixteen 32-pounder carronades. The Acorn class had a crew of 110–30 officers and ratings.

Construction and career
Grecian, the third ship of her name to serve in the Royal Navy, was ordered on 31 December 1835, laid down in July 1837 at Pembroke Dockyard, Wales, and launched on 24 April 1838. She was completed on 10 December 1838 at Plymouth Dockyard and commissioned on 19 September of that year.

Notes

References

1838 ships
Ships built in Pembroke Dock